The Moonstone is a 1909 silent film produced by William Nicholas Selig and released by Selig Polyscope Company. This film has a great chance of being a lost film; no sources indicate if any copies have existed. It is also unknown who starred in this film or who directed it.

Film background
This film was based on the British three volume novel (a standard of the time in Britain and England to separate a novel in three volumes) The Moonstone published in 1868 and which is highly regarded as one of the first English language detective crime novels. This film was remade in 1915; the oldest known version to exist. Other remakes were released in 1934, 1972, and 1997.

External links 
 

1909 films
American silent short films
Selig Polyscope Company films
Films based on British novels
Films based on works by Wilkie Collins
Silent American drama films
American black-and-white films
1909 drama films
1900s English-language films
1900s American films